The first season of the American dramatic television series Touched by an Angel premiered on CBS on September 21, 1994 where it ran for 11 episodes until it concluded on March 4, 1995. Created by John Masius and produced by Martha Williamson, the series chronicled the cases of two angels, Monica (Roma Downey) and her supervisor Tess (Della Reese), who bring messages from God to various people to help them as they reach a crossroads in their lives. A season set containing all of the episodes of the season was released to Region 1 DVD on August 31, 2004.

The episodes use the song "Walk with You", performed by Reese, as their opening theme.

Cast

Starring
Roma Downey as Monica
Della Reese as Tess

Recurring
Charles Rocket as Adam

Episodes

External links
 
 

Touched by an Angel seasons
1994 American television seasons
1995 American television seasons